Dave LaRue is an American bassist who performed with the Dixie Dregs from 1988 to 2017 and with guitarist Steve Morse's Band since 1989. He also has worked with Dream Theater's John Petrucci, Mike Portnoy, Derek Sherinian and Jordan Rudess. He plays Music Man bass guitars, among them the "Sterling" and "StingRay 5 five-string" but has mainly switched to their "Bongo" line (which he was instrumental in helping develop) including four- and five-string fretted and fretless models. From March 2006 to September 2006, he toured with Joe Satriani on the Super Colossal tour.
Most recently, LaRue became a member of the supergroup Flying Colors alongside long-time bandmate Steve Morse.

Discography

Solo albums
1992 Hub City Kid

with Dixie Dregs
Bring 'Em Back Alive  (1992)
Full Circle  (June 7, 1994)
California Screamin'  (February 1, 2000)

with Steve Morse
1991 Southern Steel
1992 Coast to Coast
1995 Structural Damage
1996 StressFest
2000 Major Impacts
2002 Split Decision
2004 Major Impacts 2
2005 Prime Cuts – From Steve Morse's Magna Carta sessions (compilation)
2009 Out Standing in Their Field

with Vinnie Moore
1999: The Maze
2001: Defying Gravity

with T Lavitz
1984 Extended Play
1986 Storytime
1987 From the West

with John Petrucci
2005 Suspended Animation
2005 G3: Live in Tokyo
2020 Terminal Velocity

with Joe Satriani
2006 Satriani Live!

with Flying Colors

2012 Flying Colors
2013 Live in Europe
2014 Second Nature
2015 Second Flight: Live at the Z7
2019 Third Degree
2019 Third Stage: Live in London
2019 Morsefest 2019

with Hammer of the Gods
2006 Two Nights in North America

with Jordan Rudess
2004 Rhythm of Time

Other Collaborations
1977 Mike Santiago & Entity - White Trees
1982 The Markley Band - On the Mark
1984 John Macey - Meltdown
1984 Stretch – Stretch 
1986 Glen Burtnik - Talking in Code
1987 Scott Stewart & the Other Side - Scott Stewart & the Other Side
2002 Planet X - Live From Oz
2005 Balance II - Balance II

DVD
2002 Steve Morse - Sects, Dregs & Rock 'n' Roll
2005 Steve Morse Band - Live In Baden-Baden Germany March 1990
2005 John Petrucci - G3 Live in Tokyo
2006 Hammer of the Gods - Two Nights in North America
2006 Joe Satriani - Satriani Live!

References

External links
 Official homepage
 
 

Living people
Dixie Dregs members
American rock bass guitarists
Progressive metal bass guitarists
American male bass guitarists
Flying Colors (band) members
1956 births